

Films by genre

Dramatic features
Am Abend nach der Oper
Aufruhr der Herzen
The Black Robe
Der blaue Schleier
Ein Blick zurück
The Buchholz Family
Das war mein Leben
The Degenhardts
Dreaming
The Enchanted Day
Der Engel mit dem Saitenspiel
Es fing so harmlos an
Es lebe die Liebe
Die Feuerzangenbowle
The Woman of My Dreams
Große Freiheit Nr. 7
I Need You
Ich habe von dir geträumt
Junge Adler
Der kleine Muck

Der Mann, dem man den Namen stahl
Marriage of Affection
The Master Detective
Nora
Opfergang
Orient Express
 The Roedern Affair
Schrammeln
Ein schöner Tag
The Wedding Hotel

Documentary features
"12 Minuten" plaudert in Zahlen
Achtung! Ratten!
Ackerbodenbearbeitung
Alltag in Barcelona
Amerikanische Brandbomben, ihre Wirkung und Bekämpfung
Antilopen der Berge
Die Arbeitsverfahren der Keramchemie
Atlantik-Wall
Aufheben, Lagern und Tragen Verletzter
Aus der Zaubertruhe des Films
Brandenburg-Preussen, Potsdam
Britische Brandbomben, ihre Wirkung und Bekämpfung. 5. Folge: Die britische Flammstrahl-Bombe
Bucher Gülle - Pumpanlage
Der Bussard
Großmarkthalle
Der Karpfen
Richtiges Tragen von Lasten
Scharfschütze in der Geländeausbildung
Theresienstadt:Der Führer schenkt den Juden eine Stadt
Verrater vor den Volksgericht
Vom Einsatz der Ordnungspolizei in allen Fronten des Krieges
Der Wille zum Leben
Ziegen und Lämmer

Documentary shorts
Arno Breker – Harte Zeit, starke Kunst
Aus Spiel wird Ernst
Die Batteriezündung
Beerenobstpflanzung und Schnitt
Der Bergbach
Bergnot
Bilder aus Finnland
Bilder von Japans Küsten
Die bildspendende Flüssigkeit
Biscaya südwärts
Bodenbearbeitung im Garten
Kindergymnastik

Animation shorts
Die Abenteuer des Freiherrn von Münchhausen
Das dumme Gänslein
Die goldene Gans
Purzelbaum ins Leben
Der Schneemann

References

External links 
IMDB listing for german films made in 1944
filmportal.de listing for films made in 1944

German
Lists of German films
film